Blake O'Connor is an Australian country music singer and songwriter.
He released his debut studio album Everything I Feel in July 2019, which landed at #1 ARIA Australian Country Charts and peaked at number 31 on the all genres international ARIA Albums Chart.

Biography

2000–2015: Early life and career beginnings
Blake O'Connor was born in Windsor, New South Wales, before moving with his family to Bathurst and Port Macquarie. His grandparents gifted him an acoustic guitar for his sixth birthday. At 14, Blake had his first gig at a wedding which inspired his first song he wrote especially for the occasion. In 2015, he was a featured artist in the NSW School's Spectacular in Sydney and then made the decision to leave school to focus full-time on music.

2016–2020: Everything I Feel 
In January 2017, O'Connor visited Tamworth, New South Wales and won the Mount Franklin talent quest, the Capitol Country Music Association male vocal category, the Coca-Cola country best youngster in Tamworth and performed three times on the Peel Street stage and once on the ABC stage. Later in 2017, O'Connor entered and won the Coca-Cola Country competition and CCMA Junior talent quest, receiving a scholarship to attend the CMAA Academy.

In June 2018, O'Conner self-released his debut, self-titled extended play.

In January 2019, O'Connor became the 40th winner of the Toyota Star Maker at the Tamworth Country Music Festival.

In July 2019, O'Connor released his debut studio album Everything I Feel which he said "it's about everything I've been through in the last year with my emotions and experience." The album debuted at number 1 on the ARIA Country Album Chart and 31 on the ARIA All-Genre Charts. In September 2019, O'Connor released "Worth a Little More" as the album's second single, along with its video.

2021–present: Finding Light 
In February 2021, O'Connor released "Willin' and Ready", followed by "Soul Feeling" in July 2021. Both singles are from his forthcoming second studio album, Finding Light. The album was announced in January 2023, with a release date of 10 March 2023.

Discography

Albums

Extended plays

Singles

Awards

Country Music Awards of Australia

The Country Music Awards of Australia (CMAA) (also known as the Golden Guitar Awards) is an annual awards night held in January during the Tamworth Country Music Festival, celebrating recording excellence in the Australian country music industry. They have been held annually since 1973.

! 
|-
|rowspan="2"| 2020 ||Blake O'Connor || Male Artist of the Year  || ||rowspan="2"| 
|-
| "Worth a Little More" by Blake Connor
| New Talent of the Year
|

References

Living people
Australian country singers
Australian country singer-songwriters
Australian country guitarists
Musicians from New South Wales
21st-century Australian singers
21st-century guitarists
21st-century Australian male singers
Australian male guitarists
2000 births
Australian male singer-songwriters